Titanium tetrabromide is the chemical compound with the formula TiBr4.  It is the most volatile transition metal bromide.  The properties of TiBr4 are an average of TiCl4 and TiI4.  Some key properties of these four-coordinated Ti(IV) species are their high Lewis acidity and their high solubility in nonpolar organic solvents.  TiBr4 is diamagnetic, reflecting the d0 configuration of the metal centre.

Preparation and structure
This four-coordinated complex adopts a tetrahedral geometry.  It can be prepared via several methods: (i) from the elements, (ii) via the reaction of TiO2 with carbon and bromine (see Kroll process), and (iii) by treatment of  TiCl4 with HBr.

Reactions
Titanium tetrabromide forms adducts such as TiBr4(THF)2 and [TiBr5]−. With bulky donor ligands, such as 2-methylpyridine (2-Mepy), five-coordinated adducts form.  TiBr4(2-MePy) is trigonal bipyramidal with the pyridine in the equatorial plane.

TiBr4 has been used as a Lewis-acid catalyst in organic synthesis.

The tetrabromide and tetrachlorides of titanium react to give a statistical mixture of the mixed tetrahalides, TiBr4−xClx (x = 0-4).  The mechanism of this redistribution reaction is uncertain.  One proposed pathway invokes the intermediacy of dimers.

Safety
TiBr4 hydrolyzes rapidly, potentially dangerously, to release hydrogen bromide, otherwise known as hydrobromic acid.

References

Bromides
Titanium halides
Titanium(IV) compounds